Quixeramobim could refer to:
 Quixeramobim, Ceará, a city and municipality in state of Ceará
 Quixeramobim River, a river in the state of Ceará
 Quixeramobim Dam, a dam in the state of Ceará